Richard Corfield (born 22 January 1962) is a scientist, science writer, and broadcaster, based in Oxford, United Kingdom.

Early life
Richard attended a boys' grammar school, William Ellis School, for the first six years of his life.

He received his BS in Zoology in 1983 from Bristol University and his PhD in biogeochemistry in 1987 from Cambridge University where he worked with Professor Sir Nicholas Shackleton FRS on the greenhouse effect during the Paleocene Epoch.

Career
He is the managing director of the Science and Media consultancy Hanborough Consultants. He has written three books: Architects of Eternity: The New Science of Fossils, The Silent Landscape: In the Wake of HMS Challenger, and Lives of the Planets; A Natural History of the Solar System.

As well as contributing to magazines, on-line publications and newspapers such as Physics World, Chemistry World, Astrobiology.net, Space.com, and The Washington Post he also wrote and appeared in the Newton Channel/Guardian documentary An Interview with Craig Venter.

He is also a regular contributor on radio, particularly to In Our Time with Melvyn Bragg, The Material World and The Report.

Personal life
He lives in Long Hanborough, on the A4095, west of Oxford. He married Julie Cartlidge, with two daughters, born in 1994 and 2000.

References 

1962 births
British science writers
Living people
British scientists
British palaeontologists
Fellows of Jesus College, Oxford
People educated at William Ellis School
People from West Oxfordshire District
Science education in the United Kingdom